John Muir "Ian" Young (21May 194311December 2019) was a Scottish footballer who played for Celtic and St Mirren.

Career
Young signed for Celtic from Neilston Waverly in June 1961. He played 145 games for the club in major competitions, scoring three times, and won the Scottish Cup in 1965 and the Scottish Football League Championship in 1965–66. Also among these appearances were 19 in European competition, including both legs of the European Cup Winners' Cup semi-final against MTK Budapest in 1964, and both legs of the semi-final of the same competition against Liverpool in 1966. He lost his place soon afterwards to the more attacking Jim Craig.

Young signed for St Mirren in the summer of 1968, where he played for a further two years, but his career ended at the age of 27 from a serious knee injury.

Young was capped once at Under-23 level for Scotland, playing at Aberdeen's Pittodrie Stadium in a 0–0 draw against England in February 1965.

Honours
Celtic 
 Scottish League Champions: 1965–66 
 Scottish Cup: 1964–65
 Scottish League Cup: 1965–66
Runner-up 1964–65

References

External links
 
 Ian Young, The Celtic Wiki

Further reading
 Young, Ian. Life with the Lions. Club Books, 2013

1943 births
2019 deaths
People from Neilston
Footballers from Renfrewshire
Scottish footballers
Association football defenders
Celtic F.C. players
St Mirren F.C. players
Scottish Football League players
Scotland under-23 international footballers
Sportspeople from East Renfrewshire